Harvard Square is a triangular plaza at the intersection of Massachusetts Avenue, Brattle Street and John F. Kennedy Street near the center of Cambridge, Massachusetts, United States. The term "Harvard Square" is also used to delineate the business district and Harvard University surrounding that intersection, which is the historic center of Cambridge. Adjacent to Harvard Yard, the historic heart of Harvard University, the Square (as it is sometimes called, locally) functions as a commercial center for Harvard students, as well as residents of western Cambridge, the western and northern neighborhoods and the inner suburbs of Boston.  The Square is served by Harvard station, a major MBTA Red Line subway and a bus transportation hub.

In an extended sense, the name "Harvard Square" can also refer to the entire neighborhood surrounding this intersection for several blocks in each direction.  The nearby Cambridge Common has become a park area with a playground, baseball field, and a number of monuments, several relating to the Revolutionary War.

Location 

The heart of Harvard Square is the junction of Massachusetts Avenue and Brattle Street. Massachusetts Avenue enters from the southeast (a few miles after crossing the Charles River from Boston at MIT), and turns sharply to the north at the intersection, which is dominated by a large pedestrian space incorporating the current MBTA subway headhouse (entrance), an older subway headhouse building which formerly housed a newsstand, a visitor information kiosk, and a small open-air performance space ("The Pit"). Brattle Street and John F. Kennedy Street merge from the southwest, joining Massachusetts Avenue at 1 Brattle Street, where another newsstand used to be located. The Harvard/MIT Cooperative Society main building forms the western streetwall at the intersection, along with a bank and some retail shops.

Nearby places
The walled enclosure of Harvard Yard is adjacent, with Harvard University, Harvard Extension School, Harvard Art Museums, Semitic Museum, Peabody Museum of Archaeology and Ethnology, and Museum of Natural History just short walks away.

Other institutions in the general neighborhood include the Cambridge Public Library, Lesley University, the Longy School of Music, the Episcopal Divinity School,  the Cambridge Rindge and Latin School, American Repertory Theater, the Cooper-Frost-Austin House, the Hooper-Lee-Nichols House, and the Longfellow House–Washington's Headquarters National Historic Site.

The high pedestrian traffic makes Harvard Square a gathering place for street musicians and buskers, who must obtain a permit from the Cambridge Arts Council. Singer-songwriter  Tracy Chapman, who attended nearby Tufts University, is known to have played here during her college years.  Amanda Palmer, of The Dresden Dolls, regularly performed here as a "living statue". Another frequent performer over the years has been indie rock guitarist Mary Lou Lord. A small bronze statue of "Doo Doo" (a puppet created by Igor Fokin) sits at the corner of Brattle and Eliot streets, in honor of Fokin and all the street performers. The Flying Karamazov Brothers also performed regularly in Brattle Square.

Other features 

Until 1984, the Harvard Square stop was the northern terminus of the Red Line, and it still functions as a major transfer station between subway, bus, and trackless trolley.  Most of the bus lines serving the area from the north and west run through a tunnel adjacent to the subway tunnel. Originally built for streetcars (which last ran in 1958) and still used by trackless trolleys as well as ordinary buses, the tunnel lessens bus traffic in central Harvard Square, and lets buses cross the Square without encountering automobile traffic.  The tunnel also allows covered access between the subway and the buses.

At the center of the Square is the old Harvard Square Subway Kiosk, which held a newsstand Out of Town News until its close in 2020. A public motion art installation, Lumen Eclipse, shows monthly exhibitions of local, national, and international artists.

The office of NPR's Car Talk radio show faced the square, with a stencil in the window that reads "Dewey, Cheetham & Howe," the fictional law firm often referenced on the show. 

In the southwest of the neighborhood, on Mount Auburn St, stands the Igor Fokin Memorial.  This memorial, created by sculptor Konstantin Simun, pays tribute not only to the late puppeteer, but to all street performers that are an integral part of the square.

A number of public squares dot the surrounding streets, notably Brattle Square and Winthrop Square, hosting a wide variety of street performers throughout the year. Brattle Street itself is home to the Brattle Theater (a non-profit  arthouse theater) and the American Repertory Theater. The John F. Kennedy Memorial Park, one block further down JFK Street, is on the bank of the Charles River.  Cambridge Common is two blocks north.

The Square attracts activists for unconventional political factions and has its share of panhandlers. Although Tom Magliozzi derided it as "the bum capital of the world", it is a popular site to people-watch, having many benches, terraces, and sidewalk restaurants and cafes dedicated for that purpose.

History 

Although today a commercial center, the Square had famous residents in earlier periods, including the colonial poet Anne Bradstreet.

Transformation 

Discussions of how the Square has changed in recent years usually center on the gentrification of the Harvard Square neighborhood and Cambridge in general. The Square also used to be a neighborhood shopping center, including a grocery store (Sages) and a Woolworth's five and ten.  Although a hardware store (Dickson Hardware at 26 Brattle Street) survived until 2021 amid chain drug stores and bank branches, the Square is mainly a regional rather than neighborhood shopping destination, serving students and commuters.

In 1981 and 1987 the Harvard Square Theater was converted into a multiplex cinema; it later became part of the Loews Cineplex Entertainment chain and then closed on July 8, 2012.  During the late 1990s, some locally run businesses with long-time shopfronts on the Square—including the unusual Tasty Diner, a tiny sandwich shop open long hours, and the Wursthaus, a German restaurant with an extensive beer menu—closed to make way for national chains. Elsie's Lunch, a long-popular deli, has also closed; what remained of its small corner storefront space facing Lowell House on Mount Auburn Street is now occupied by an ATM. Another long-time restaurant, the 64-year-old Leo's Place, closed in December 2013 when the landlord of the property terminated their lease. 

The student co-op, the Harvard/MIT Cooperative Society ("The Coop", founded in 1882) is now managed by Barnes & Noble, though it is still overseen by a board elected by its membership of Harvard and MIT students and staff. Schoenhof's Foreign Books is owned by the French Éditions Gallimard. Major bookstores Paperback Booksmith, Reading International, and Barilari Books had closed by the end of the 1990s.  WordsWorth Books at 30 Brattle Street closed in 2004, after 29 years as a fixture in the Square. In the same year, the famous Grolier Poetry Bookshop announced that it would be sold (although it survived under new management). Globe Corner Bookstore converted to an exclusively online business, serving its last walk-in customer on July 4, 2011.

Following national trends, the former Harvard Trust Company has been absorbed into the national Bank of America through a series of mergers.  Several establishments remain as longstanding, locally-run businesses with unique styles. Examples include Leavitt & Peirce tobacconists (est. 1883), Laflamme Barber Shop (est. 1898), Harvard Book Store (est. 1932), Cardullo's Gourmet Shoppe (est. 1950), Charlie's Kitchen (est. 1951), the Brattle Theater (est. 1953), the Hong Kong Chinese restaurant (est. 1954), Club Passim (est. 1958), Café Pamplona (est. 1959), Mr. Bartley's Burger Cottage (est. 1960), Million Year Picnic comics (est. 1970), Algiers Coffee House (est. 1970), and Grendel's Den (est. 1971).

In film and other media
The 1969 film Goodbye, Columbus takes place in Harvard Square near the film's conclusion, after the Richard Benjamin character learns that his girlfriend, Brenda Potimkin (played by Ali MacGraw), an undergraduate at Radcliffe College, had left her diaphragm in the top drawer of her bureau at home for her mother to discover.

The 1970 film Love Story, by the late Harvard University alumnus and Yale University professor of classics Erich Segal, takes place almost entirely in and around Harvard Square during its first two-thirds, while Harvard undergraduates Oliver Barrett and Jenny Cavalieri meet; finish college; get married; and Oliver goes to Harvard Law School while Jenny teaches school, living in a second-story walk-up in Agassiz. The film continues to be screened annually to incoming freshmen at Harvard College during orientation week.

The 1973 film The Paper Chase, set at Harvard Law School, features Harvard Square landmarks of its era, including the old Out of Town Newsstand, the old MBTA Harvard station kiosk with its "8 Minutes to Park Street" sign, and the now-defunct Kupersmith's Florists.

The 1977 film Between the Lines features similar Harvard Square footage as well as aerial footage of the Back Bay.

The 1994 film With Honors has a scene filmed in Harvard Square in which the Out of Town Newsstand is featured.  In the scene, Monty approaches Simon as he (Simon) is attempting to sell newspapers he took out of a vending machine.

Various parts of the 1997 film Good Will Hunting were filmed in and around Harvard Square, most notably at the former Tasty Sandwich Shop and the outdoor seating area of the square's largest Au Bon Pain café.

The 2005 documentary film Touching History; Harvard Square, the Bank, and The Tasty Diner chronicles the changing face of the Square, as a small diner (The Tasty) closes its doors to make way for a large retail space.

Ben Affleck shot portions of his film The Town (2010) in Grendel's Den on Winthrop Street, locally famous in the 1970s for its chocolate fondue.

The 2015 game Fallout 4 features Harvard Square as an in-game location. Though the layout of the surrounding are is not accurate, the Cambridge visitor's Center kiosk is present.

Gallery

See also 
Design Research
National Register of Historic Places listings in Cambridge, Massachusetts
Orson Welles Cinema
William Brattle House
Conductor's Building
St. Paul Church (Cambridge, Massachusetts)

References
Notes

Citations

Further reading
 
 Sullivan, Charles M., "Harvard Square History and Development", Cambridge Historical Commission

External links

 Harvard Square History and Development
 Postcard view, ca. 1930-1945

 
Bookstore neighborhoods
Busking venues
Cultural history of Boston
Landmarks in Cambridge, Massachusetts
Historic districts in Middlesex County, Massachusetts
National Register of Historic Places in Cambridge, Massachusetts
Neighborhoods in Cambridge, Massachusetts
Squares in Cambridge, Massachusetts